Darren Michalski is a former professional rugby league footballer, who scored a single try for London Crusaders in 1993–94.

References

1968 births
Living people
English rugby league players
London Broncos players
Place of birth missing (living people)